Mozac is a commune in the Puy-de-Dôme department in Auvergne in central France.

Population

See also
Communes of the Puy-de-Dôme department

References

Communes of Puy-de-Dôme
Puy-de-Dôme communes articles needing translation from French Wikipedia